Arthania ( ’Arṯāniya) was one of the three states of the Rus or Saqaliba (early East Slavs) with the center in Artha described in a lost book by Abu Zayd al-Balkhi (dating from ca. 920) and mentioned in works by some of his followers (Ibn Hawqal, Al-Istakhri, Hudud ul-'alam). The two other centers were Slawiya ( Ṣ(a)lāwiya; tentatively identified with the land of Ilmen Slavs, see Rus Khaganate) and Kuyaba ( Kūyāba; usually identified with Kyiv).

Ibn Hawqal claims that nobody has ever visited Artha because the locals kill every foreigner attempting to penetrate their land. They are involved in trade with Kuyaba, selling sable furs, lead, and a modicum of slaves.

Modern historians have been unable to pinpoint the location of Arthania. A linguistic line of argument leads some historians to such far-away places as Cape Arkona on the Baltic Sea, the land of the Erzya (an ethnic group of the Mordva nation; see Gelons and Mordvins) and the Plisnesk hillfort in the Upper Western Bug. George Vernadsky located Arsa on the Taman Peninsula (see Tmutarakan), while Vladimir Minorsky connected "Arsa" with Ryazan. No archaeological confirmation of these linguistic speculations has ever been produced.

Modern Russian historiography tends to identify Arthania with the land of the Merya serving the Volga trade route. Archaeological evidence points to Sarskoe Gorodishche and Timerevo as its main centers. The native name of either town remains unknown; either may have been called Arsa in a native dialect.

References 

History of the Rus' people
Former countries in Europe
Medieval Russia